Richard Frank Celeste (born November 11, 1937) is an American former diplomat, university administrator and politician from Ohio. A member of the Democratic Party, he served as the 64th governor of Ohio from 1983 to 1991.

Early life and career
Celeste was born in Cleveland, Ohio and grew up in Lakewood, Ohio, the son of Margaret Louis and Frank Palm Celeste. His father was born in Cerisano, Italy. He graduated from Lakewood High School in 1955.  In 1959, he graduated magna cum laude from Yale University where he was a member of Phi Beta Kappa. Celeste then received a Rhodes Scholarship to attend Exeter College at Oxford University, where he is an Honorary Fellow. There he met Dagmar Ingrid Braun, whom he married in Austria in 1962. After returning to the United States, Celeste served as staff liaison office in the Peace Corps and as special assistant to Chester Bowles.

Celeste was elected to the Ohio House of Representatives from Cuyahoga County in 1970. His Ohio House District included western Cleveland and Lakewood, where his father Frank, had once served as mayor.  He was subsequently elected the 55th lieutenant governor of Ohio in 1974 (defeating Republican John W. Brown, serving under the Republican James A. Rhodes—at the time, Ohio's lieutenant governor was elected separately from the governor, so the victors could be of different parties). In 1978, Celeste ran for governor, but lost to incumbent Rhodes. President Carter appointed Celeste Director of the Peace Corps from 1979 to 1981, where he was responsible for programs in 53 countries.

Governor of Ohio

In 1982, Celeste defeated Attorney General William J. Brown and former Cincinnati Mayor Jerry Springer in the primary, and then the Republican candidate Clarence J. "Bud" Brown Jr., to become governor of Ohio. In 1986, Celeste was re-elected, defeating the Republican candidate, former governor James Rhodes who had served four prior terms (1962–70 and 1974–82). Thus Celeste served as governor of Ohio from 1983 to 1991. In 1988 he served as the Chairman of the Midwestern Governors Association.

As governor, Celeste increased support for human services, mental health & addiction recovery  services, funding for education and children services including providing onsite daycare for state employees. Before the Celeste era, Ohio ranked near the bottom among states in funding for these programs. Celeste and the Democratic-controlled legislature increased the state income tax by approximately 40% while also retaining a temporary tax of 50% instituted by the Republican predecessors. Celeste is noted for opening many government positions to African Americans and women—he hired more women to cabinet positions than all previous governors combined.  Celeste also allowed state employee unions to negotiate wages and benefits, rather than just working conditions.  At the end of his last term he commuted several Ohio prisoners death sentences to life terms. Among them was Debra Brown's along with the sentences of most alleged battered women serving sentences at Marysville state prison for murdering their alleged aggressors. He also commuted Donald Lee Maurer to life in prison. Maurer had been convicted of raping and killing his 8 year old Massillon neighbor Dawn Marie Hendershot in the early 1980s. He opposed nuclear power in Ohio over evacuation plans.

Under the Celestes, the  Governor's art exhibits, chamber music concerts and First Lady's spiritual retreats and theology gatherings as well as Christmas and Hanukkah parties for neighborhood kids became regular seasonal events. The Residence Gardens, especially the rose garden, one of the oldest in the nation, were reconstituted and The Friends of the Residence were formed, with Les Wexner as their first president, to help raise private funds to defray the cost of those improvements.

Post-gubernatorial political career

Celeste then established the consulting firm Celeste & Sabety Ltd. in Columbus. After he served as the director of the DNC's healthcare campaign in 1993, President Clinton appointed him as United States Ambassador to India, a position he served in from 1997 to 2001.

Celeste is a member of the advisory board of the Roosevelt Institution, a student think tank. He is a member of the Council on Foreign Relations. Celeste, along with Thomas Kean who co-chaired the 9/11 Commission, co-chairs the Homeland Security Project for The Century Foundation. He also sits on the board of the Independent Strategic Assessment Group, United States Northern Command (NORTHCOM), which is the military command over the USA established in the wake of the attacks of September 11. Celeste joined the board of Directors of Glimcher Realty Trust in September 2007. Celeste has also been a member of the CHF International Board of Trustees since January 2012.

He is currently on the board of directors for Battelle for Kids, a not-for-profit organization dedicated to moving education forward for students by supporting the educators who work with them every day.

In 2020, Celeste, with another former governor Bob Taft were appointed to establish and lead a task force to help expand COVID-19 testing in Ohio during the pandemic.

President of Colorado College
Celeste was inaugurated as the 12th President of Colorado College in 2002.

During his tenure as president, Celeste raised $200 million for such things as capital improvements and scholarships to help disadvantaged and minority students. His other accomplishments included Addition of 20 tenure-track faculty positions, a large increase in the size of the student applicant pool, from 3,533 in 2003 to 4,455 in 2010, and an increase in selectivity, with 55.9 percent of applicants accepted in 2003 to 33.3 percent accepted in 2010.

Celeste oversaw major renovations of campus buildings, including Palmer Hall, Cossitt Hall and Packard Hall; construction of the interdisciplinary Edith Kinney Gaylord Cornerstone Arts Center.

In 2004, a Jewish group called for Celeste's resignation after he invited a high-profile Palestinian to give a lecture.

Celeste was known for bringing the community and the college together. He was the president of the Colorado Springs Downtown Partnership, the Colorado Economics Future Panel, the NCAA Presidential Task Force on the Future of Intercollegiate Athletics, and the Colorado Forum, which tackles public policy issues.

Celeste has since retired as President of Colorado College.  He started serving as president in 2002, and was replaced in July 2011 by Jill Tiefenthaler, provost and economics professor at Wake Forest University.

Personal life
Celeste had six children with his first wife, Dagmar. The couple divorced in 1995. Celeste is currently married to Jacqueline Lundquist. Celeste and Lundquist have one child, Sam. Celeste has 13 grandchildren, including two who were students at Colorado College and one who is a graduate of Case Western Reserve University.

His brother, Theodore S. Celeste, successfully ran as a Democratic Party candidate for the Ohio House in 2006.

In 2022, Celeste's autobiography, In the Heart of it All: An Unvarnished Account of My Life in Public Service, was published.

Legacy
The Celeste Center at the Ohio Expo Center and State Fair in Columbus, Ohio, is named in honor of Celeste.  The Richard F. Celeste Laboratory of Chemistry on the Columbus Campus of the Ohio State University is named in honor of the former Governor. In addition, the Richard F. Celeste Theater at the Cornerstone Arts Center of Colorado College is named in honor of his tenure as president.

See also
 Ohio gubernatorial elections

References

External links

1937 births
20th-century American politicians
Alumni of Exeter College, Oxford
Ambassadors of the United States to India
Methodists from Ohio
American people of Italian descent
American Rhodes Scholars
Democratic Party governors of Ohio
Italian-American culture in Cleveland
Lieutenant Governors of Ohio
Living people
Democratic Party members of the Ohio House of Representatives
Politicians from Cleveland
Presidents of Colorado College
Peace Corps directors
Peace Corps volunteers
Yale University alumni
20th-century American diplomats
21st-century American diplomats